A Dead Horse is the fourth album by The Golden Palominos, released on January 1, 1989, by Celluloid Records.

Track listing

Personnel 
Musicians
Jeff Bova – keyboards, programming
Aïyb Dieng – percussion
Anton Fier – drums, additional production
Robert Kidney – guitar
Amanda Kramer – vocals
Bill Laswell – bass violon
Chuck Leavell – Keyboards
Larry Saltzman – guitar
Nicky Skopelitis – guitar
Mick Taylor – guitar
Bernie Worrell – Hammond organ
Production and additional personnel
Oz Fritz – engineering, mixing, recording
William Garrett – recording
John Herman – recording
Steve Klatz – drum technician
Robert Longo – design, photography
Christiane Mathan – design
Robert Musso – recording
Frank W. Ockenfels– photography
Steve Rinkoff – mixing, recording

References

External links 
 

1989 albums
Celluloid Records albums
The Golden Palominos albums
Albums produced by Anton Fier